The Joyner Building was a historic classroom/administration building located on the campus of Western Carolina University in Cullowhee, Jackson County, North Carolina.  brick Colonial  It was built in 1913-1914, and was a two-story on a raised basement, "T"-shaped red brick building with a cross-gab1e-on-hip roof.  The main block was 11 bays wide and six bays deep.

In 1978, it was added to the National Register of Historic Places.  It was destroyed by fire in 1981, and the site is now the location of Joyner Plaza near the Moore Building.

Uses
Joyner Building was destroyed by fire on January 15, 1981.  It was about to undergo renovation.  Built in 1913-1914, it had over the year housed classrooms, labs, administrative offices, the college post office, college shop, college library, and college book exchange for decades.  At the time of the fire, it was the oldest building on campus and was being used as the home of the Western Carolinian (WCU's college newspaper), and as a meeting place for student organizations.  The ruins were deemed a hazard and were knocked down the following week.  The site is now Joyner Plaza.  The oldest buildings on campus are now Moore (1917–1924) and the Steam Plant (1924)

See also
National Register of Historic Places listings in Jackson County, North Carolina
List of Registered Historic Places in North Carolina

References

University and college buildings on the National Register of Historic Places in North Carolina
School buildings completed in 1914
Buildings and structures in Jackson County, North Carolina
National Register of Historic Places in Jackson County, North Carolina
Buildings and structures demolished in 1981
1981 fires in the United States
Western Carolina University
1914 establishments in North Carolina